Munza is an afrotropical cicada genus.

References

Taxa named by William Lucas Distant
Cicadidae genera
Platypleurini